is a Japanese manga artist best known for her gothic manga such as Earl Cain, its sequel Godchild, and Angel Sanctuary. Her work is typically serialized in one of Hakusensha's two shōjo manga anthologies, Bessatsu Hana to Yume and Hana to Yume. In 2010, Kaori Yuki was one of many manga artists whose work would appear in the new shōjo manga anthology Aria by the publisher Kodansha on July 28, 2010.

Personal life 
Kaori Yuki is a pen name; originally she had chosen "Eri Minase" but then decided on "Kao Yuki," derived from the actress Yuki Saito, with the addition of a "Ri" character for the pen name "Kaori Yuki."

Bibliography

Manga 
  (1987)
 When a Heart Beats (1987)
 Devil Inside (1988)
 
 (1992, Hana to Yume Comics, Hakusensha, ; English translation, 2006)
 (1993, Hana to Yume Comics, Hakusensha, ; English translation, 2006)
 (1994, Hana to Yume Comics, Hakusensha, ; English translation, 2007)
 (1994, Hana to Yume Comics, Hakusensha, 2 volumes (vol.1: ,); English translation, 2007)
 (1992–1993, 2001, Hana to Yume Comics, Hakusensha)
 (1993, Hana to Yume Comics, Hakusensha)
 (1993, Hana to Yume Comics, Hakusensha, ）
 (1994–2000, Hana to Yume Comics, Hakusensha, 20 volumes; English translation, 2004)
 Kaine (1996)
 (1997, Hana to Yume Comics, Hakusensha)
 (2001–2003, Hana to Yume Comics, Hakusensha, 8 volumes; English translation, 2005)
 (2003–2004, Hana to Yume Comics, Hakusensha)
 (2004–2005, Hana to Yume Comics, Hakusensha, ; English translation)
 (2004–2007, Hana to Yume Comics, Hakusensha, 4 volumes)
  (2005–2006, Hana to Yume Comics, Hakusensha, 3 volumes; English translation, 2008)
 Psycho Knocker (2004, one-shot in Fairy Cube #3)
 (2008, Bessatsu Hana to Yume, Hakusensha, one-shot)
 (2008–2010, Hana to Yume Comics, Hakusensha, 5 volumes; English translation, 2010)
  (2010–2013, Aria, Kodansha, 6 volumes; English translation, 2014)
(January 2014–September 2018, Aria, Kodansha, 11 volumes; English translation, 2015)
  (2019–2021, Palcy, Kodansha, 5 volumes; English translation, 2021)
  (2022..., Hana Yume Ai, Hakusensha, ongoing)

Art books 
 The Art of Angel Sanctuary: Angel Cage, 1997, Hakusensha, ; English translation, 2005
 The Art of Angel Sanctuary II: Lost Angel, 2000, Hakusensha, ; English translation, 2007

Postcard books 
 Card Gallery, 1995, Hakusensha,  (4-592-72032-6)
 Angel Sanctuary Postcard Book: Angelic Voice, 1999, Hakusensha,

Video game character design
 (2001)

References 
Sources:

External links 
 UnDERGARDEN - Kaori Yuki's homepage 
 Hakusensha's Comicate Interview with Kaori Yuki 
 

 
Japanese female comics artists
Female comics writers
Living people
Women manga artists
Manga artists from Tokyo
Year of birth missing (living people)
Japanese women writers
Japanese writers